Poshteh Abbas (also Romanized as Poshteh ‘Abbās) is a village in Frughan Rural District, Rud Ab District, Sabzevar County, Razavi Khorasan Province, Iran. At the 2006 census, its population was 34, in 6 families.

References 

Populated places in Sabzevar County